Tajabad-e Yek may refer to:
Tajabad-e Yek, Bardsir